The medical post-nominal suffix DObst RCOG is awarded to obstetricians and gynaecologists who have gained the Diploma of the Royal College of Obstetricians and Gynaecologists. The Diploma is aimed at doctors, and especially general practitioners, who wish to certificate their knowledge and interest in Women's Health.

See also 
 Royal College of Obstetricians and Gynaecologists
 MRCOG

References

External links 
The DObst RCOG
Official website of The Royal College of Gynaecologists

Obstetrics